Skoki Mountain is a mountain located in Banff National Park in Alberta, Canada.  It is situated towards the east of the Skoki Valley, at the head of the Red Deer River, and is part of the Slate Range.  At the base of the mountain lies Skoki Lodge, a historic ski lodge constructed in 1931, where several routes up to the  peak originate.

Skoki Mountain was named by James F. Porter in 1911 after the Indian word for marsh or swamp.

References

Two-thousanders of Alberta
Mountains of Banff National Park